ACCULAR is a family of artillery rockets developed and manufactured by Israel Military Industries (IMI) and used by Israel Defense Forces and international customers. It features 2 different calibers with a maximum range of 40 km with a 20–35 kg unitary penetration or controlled fragmentation warhead and accuracy of 10m CEP.

The ACCULAR missiles can be launched by IMI's LYNX (MRL) launcher, as well as from a variety of other available launchers.

AccuLAR-160 

A guided version and further development of the unguided LAR-160.

AccuLAR-122 
In service in IDF, under the name Romach, with dedicated M270 MLRS launchers. Each launcher can fire 18 rockets within a minute.

AccuLAR-122 can also be launched from IMI LYNX (MRL). It has a maximum range of 35 km and accuracy of 10m CEP.

See also 

LAR-160
EXTRA
Predator Hawk

References

Rocket weapons
Surface-to-surface missiles
Guided missiles of Israel